Basile Panurgias is a French writer. He was born in Paris in 1967. He studied art history before devoting himself to writing. He is the author of several novels, among them Soho, Perdre le nord (nominated for the 2016 European Book Prize) and Le Pinkie-Pinkie (nominated for the Prix de Flore).

Panurgias has lived in New York, London, and Copenhagen.

References

French writers
1967 births
Living people